Báruè District is a district of Manica Province in western Mozambique. Its principal town is Catandica. The district is located in the west of the province, and borders with Guro District in the north, Macossa District in the east, Gondola District in the southeast, Manica District in the south, and with Zimbabwe in the west. It has a population of 137,582 as of 2007.

Geography
The Pandira River, Tchatola River, and Gairezi River form the eastern boundary with Zimbabwe. The Mupha River, a tributary of the Gairezi, forms the northern border with Guro District. The Pungwe River forms the southern border with Manica and Gondola districts.

According to the Köppen climate classification, the district has tropical wet and dry climate, except for the Choa Mountains, where it is tropical humid.

History
The Kingdom of Barue was first mentioned in 1506. In 1650, the Portuguese under the command of António Lobo da Silva conquered it.

Demographics
As of 2005, 49% of the population of the district was younger than 15 years. 29% did speak Portuguese. The most common mothertongue is Chitwe language. 69% were analphabetic, mostly women.

Administrative divisions
The district is divided into three postos, Nhampassa (three localities), Catandica (three localities),  and Serra Chôa (two localities).

Economy
1% of the households in the district have access to electricity.

Agriculture
In the district, there are 15,000 farms which have on average  of land. The main agricultural products are corn, cassava, cowpea, peanut, sorghum, and sweet potato.

Transportation
There is a road network in the district which includes  of the national road EN102 connecting Chimoio and Tete.

References

Districts in Manica Province